Roy Lambert (birth unknown) is a Welsh former professional rugby league footballer who played in the 1950s.

Playing career

International honours
Lambert won 7 caps for Wales in 1950–1952 while at Neath, Dewsbury, and Warrington.

Club career
Lambert signed for Warrington from Dewsbury in December 1951 for a fee of £2,500. Lambert's only Wigan appearance was the 16-6 victory over Hunslet at Central Park, Wigan on Saturday 21 August 1954. He was on loan from Castleford.

References

External links
Statistics at wigan.rlfans.com
(archived by web.archive.org) Statistics at thecastlefordtigers.co.uk ℅ web.archive.org
Statistics at wolvesplayers.thisiswarrington.co.uk

Living people
Castleford Tigers players
Dewsbury Rams players
Neath RLFC players
Place of birth missing (living people)
Rugby league wingers
Wales national rugby league team players
Warrington Wolves players
Welsh rugby league players
Wigan Warriors players
Year of birth missing (living people)